Erie MetroParks was formed as the "Erie County Metropolitan Park District" in 1968 and adopted its current name in 1991.

It was organized under the provisions of the Ohio Revised Code, Section 1545, as a separate political division of Ohio.  Erie MetroParks is overseen by a Board of Park Commissioners consisting of three members appointed to three-year terms by Judges of the Probate Court and Common Pleas Court of Erie County. Its purpose, according to the statute, is to "preserve, conserve, protect, and enhance the natural and unique historical resources of the park district.  Further, to provide opportunities for visitors and residents to use, enjoy, understand and appreciate these resources in a responsible, sustainable manner."

List of parks and their locations
Huron Township

Located between Sandusky and Huron on US 6:
 East Sandusky Bay Preserve MetroPark,  including:
 Joseph Steinen Wildlife Area, purchased in 2003. Includes the official Erie County Ohio Bicentennial Barn, one of 88 barns painted with a special graphic design commemorating the 200th anniversary of Ohio statehood in 2003.  A new farm animal park called "The Barnyard" is also located at the Bicentennial Barn.  Open, with a primitive nature trail but with public access limited during special youth hunting seasons.
 Putnam Marsh Nature Preserve, a protected natural area because of its importance as one of the last undeveloped naturally functioning marshes on the southern Lake Erie shoreline and a critical habitat area for many plants and animals.  It was purchased in 2003. Public access is limited.
 Community Foundation Preserve at Eagle Point, a wooded area named because it is the location of at least two bald eagle nest sites.  Access to this park is restricted during the bald eagle nesting season, but open to the public at all other times.
 Wyandot Wetland Meadows Preserve, the newest park area purchased in 2006.  Open by permit only.
 Osborn MetroPark, the first park developed by Erie MetroParks on the former Osborn State Prison Honor Farm, dedicated in 1975.  Picnic shelters, a playground, soccer fields and baseball diamonds are available here along with walking trails and community gardens.  The Frost Center building serves as the Park District headquarters and includes community meeting rooms.  The operation department offices are located at the Maple Grove Center along with the "Erie MetroBark Park," a fenced, off-leash dog exercise area on the Hull Road side of the park.
 In addition, Erie MetroParks jointly  manages the "East Sandusky Bay Extension", adjacent to the Community Foundation Preserve, the location of the former Sandusky Drive-in theater (torn down in 2007), with the City of Sandusky.

Located on the campus of BGSU Firelands, Rye Beach Road in Huron:
 James H. McBride Arboretum, created in 1984, the arboretum was named in honor of Dr. James H. McBride, the first Dean of Firelands College.  Managed for BGSU Firelands by Erie MetroParks.

Located South of Huron, along the Huron River:
 DuPont Marsh State Nature Preserve, owned by the Ohio Department of Natural Resources (ODNR), and managed by Erie MetroParks.
 Huron River Greenway MetroPark (north), a rail trail constructed on an abandoned Wheeling and Lake Erie Railway line. The northern trailhead is in Huron Township and shares its parking lot and entrance with the DuPont Marsh State Nature Preserve.

Perkins Township

Pelton Park Drive, off Hull Road, Perkins Township:
 Pelton Park, a small wooded park surrounded by residential and commercial development. Owned by Perkins Township.

A portion of the Putnam Marsh Nature Preserve previously listed is also located in Perkins Township.

Milan Township

Located north of Milan on State Route 13:
  The Coupling MetroPark, a combination of sloping and river bottom lands, including a seasonal boat launch on the Huron River; historic railroad freight cars converted to bunk houses and a historic Wheeling and Lake Erie Railway depot from Monroeville, Ohio, equipped with a kitchen and meeting room and available for rent by the public.

Located at the foot of Old Main Street in the Village of Milan:
 Huron River Greenway MetroPark (south), follows the route of the former Milan Canal.

Berlin Township

Located north of Berlin Heights on State Route 61:
 Edison Woods MetroPark, once slated to become a nuclear power plant, this site is now an important ecological area. It also contains some of the last old growth forest in Erie County and former farm fields that are being restored to native prairie.

Located South of the Ohio Turnpike on Huff Road:
 Hoffman Forest MetroPark, consists of meadow-to-forest land in succession and mature forest plant communities.

Margaretta Township

Located south-west of Castalia on State Route 101:
 Castalia Quarry MetroPark, formerly a limestone quarry, this once barren land is slowly returning to a natural state.

Florence Township

Unincorporated community of Birmingham on State Route 113:
 Birmingham School MetroPark, a small recreation park with a picnic ground and ball field.  The location of the old Birmingham School building, demolished in 1986.

References

External links
 Erie MetroParks

Park districts in Ohio
Protected areas of Erie County, Ohio